Muž, který stoupl v ceně is a 1967 Czechoslovak film directed by Jan Moravec and Zdeněk Podskalský. The film starred Josef Kemr.

References

External links
 

1967 films
Czechoslovak comedy films
1960s Czech-language films
Films directed by Zdeněk Podskalský
Czech comedy films
1960s Czech films